One Night, also known as 38 Witnesses, is a 2012 Belgian-French drama film directed by Lucas Belvaux. It was written by Belvaux based on Didier Decoin's novel Est-ce ainsi que les femmes meurent?. It premiered on 30 January 2012, at the International Film Festival Rotterdam. The film was nominated for seven Magritte Awards, winning Best Screenplay.

Plot
When Louise Morvand returns from a business trip to China she discovers that a crime has been committed in her hometown. A woman has been murdered in the very street where Louise lives with her husband Pierre. Upon initial police investigation it appears that there were no witnesses to the crime, and Louise's neighbours seem to be strangely uninterested in finding the murderer. Haunted by a feeling of guilt, Pierre goes to the police station and admits that he heard screams and saw the attacked woman from the window on the night of the murder. Following his testimony at the police, Pierre is misunderstood by his wife and ostracized and harassed by his neighbours. A full investigation reveals that 38 people actually witnessed the crime, but none of them called police or did anything to help the victim. Journalist Sylvie Loriot is determined to reveal the truth to the public. The police reconstructs the crime with the help of the witnesses, and Louise leaves her husband.

Cast
 Yvan Attal as captain Pierre Morvand
 Sophie Quinton as Louise Morvand (Pierre's wife)
 Nicole Garcia as journalist Sylvie Loriot
 François Feroleto as Léonard
 Natacha Régnier as Anne
 Patrick Descamps as Petrini
 Didier Sandre as Lacourt
 Pierre Rochefort as the young policeman

References

External links

2012 films
2012 drama films
Belgian drama films
French drama films
Magritte Award winners
2010s French-language films
French-language Belgian films
Films directed by Lucas Belvaux
2010s French films